(round-arch style) is a nineteenth-century historic revival style of architecture popular in the German-speaking lands and the German diaspora. It combines elements of Byzantine, Romanesque, and Renaissance architecture with particular stylistic motifs.  It forms a German branch of Romanesque Revival architecture sometimes used in other countries.

History and description
The style was the deliberate creation of German architects seeking a German national style of architecture, particularly Heinrich Hübsch (1795–1863). It emerged in Germany as a response to and reaction against the neo-Gothic style that had come to the fore in the late 18th and early 19th centuries.  By adopting the smooth facade of late antique and medieval church architecture, it aimed to extend and develop the noble simplicity and quiet grandeur of neo-classicism, while moving in a direction more suited to the rise of industrialism and the emergence of German nationalism. Hallmarks of the style, in addition to the rounded arches from which it takes its name, include "eyebrows" over the windows and inverted crenelation under the eaves.

 was employed for a number of railway stations, including those in Karlsruhe, Leipzig, Munich, Tübingen, and Völklingen. These were typically "first-generation" stations (built between 1835 and 1870); some were razed to be replaced by larger buildings.  Those in Tübingen and Völklingen are still extant, while the Bayerischer Bahnhof in Leipzig is partially preserved.

 was also widely employed in synagogue architecture.  The first in this style was the Kassel Synagogue designed by Heinrich Hübsch with Albrecht Rosengarten, built in the latter's native city, Kassel, Hesse-Kassel, in 1839. An early example in the United States is the Gates of Heaven Synagogue in Madison, Wisconsin, built in 1863 and designed by August Kutzbock, an immigrant from Bremen, Germany.  Kutzbock also (co)designed secular buildings employing , such as the Carrie Pierce House (1857) in Madison.  It was restored in 2008 and adapted for use as a boutique hotel, known as the Mansion Hill Inn.

 architecture was influential in England, with Alfred Waterhouse's buildings for what is now called the Natural History Museum (originally the British Museum Natural History Collection) in London showing a direct and self-conscious emulation of the style.

German synagogues

German train stations

architecture in New York City

architecture in Hungary

-influenced architecture in England

in Belgium
The Rundbogenstil was also widely employed in Belgium, for public buildings as well as for churches. A keen promotor of Neoclassiscism and the Rundbogenstil in Belgium was architect Lodewijk Roelandt (1786-1864), who lived in the city of Ghent. Among his achievements in Rundbogenstil are St Anne's Church (Sint-Annakerk (Gent)), the riding school Arena Van Vletingen, both in Ghent, and the Onze-Lieve-Vrouw-van-Bijstand-der-Christenenkerk (Sint-Niklaas) at Sint-Niklaas.

See also
 List of architectural styles

References
Notes

External links

Architectural styles
 
Rundbogenstil synagogues
 Rundbogenstil